Gevherhan Sultan ("Gem of the Khan";  1544/1545 –  after 1623) was an Ottoman princess, the daughter of Sultan Selim II (reign 1566–1574) and his favorite Nurbanu Sultan. She was the granddaughter of Suleiman the Magnificent (reign 1520–66) and Hürrem Sultan, sister of Sultan Murad III (reign 1574–95) and aunt of Sultan Mehmed III (reign 1595–1603).

Early life
Gevherhan Sultan was born in Manisa in 1544 or 1545. Her father was Şehzade Selim (future Selim II), son of Sultan Suleiman the Magnificent and Hurrem Sultan. She spent her early life in Manisa and Konya, where her father served as a sanjak-bey. Her mother was Nurbanu Sultan, favorite of Selim and his future Haseki Sultan and wedded wife.

She had an older sister, Şah Sultan, two younger sister, Ismihan Sultan and Fatma Sultan, a younger brother, Murad III, and six younger half-brother who died infants when Murad became Sultan.

The lack of knowledge of precise birth dates for her and her sisters Şah (born 1544) and Ismihan (born 1545) has created several speculations about her birth:
 Gevherhan may have been born in late 1544 or early 1545, with Şah born in early 1544 and Ismihan in late 1545. However, this easily overlaps with Murad's date of birth, who Nurbanu gave birth to the 4 July 1546.
 Gevherhan may have been the twin of Şah or Ismihan. This would solve the tight deadlines of their births, but a twin birth would have been probraly celebrated and registered.
 Gevherhan may not be Nurbanu's daughter, however this minority opinion contradicts records and sources, which indicate Nurbanu as the mother of all three princesses.

First marriage
In 1562, strong alliances were made for the daughters of Şehzade Selim, the prince who would succeed Suleiman as Selim II, on 17 August 1562 Ismihan married Sokollu Mehmed Pasha, Gevherhan the admiral Piyale Pasha, and Şah the chief falconer Hasan Agha. The State Treasury covered the expenses for the imperial wedding and granted 15,000 florins as a wedding gift to the imperial son-in-law.

After the triple wedding, Mihrimah Sultan, Gevherhan's aunt, pushed assiduously for a naval campaign against Malta, enlisting the help of the grand vizier Semiz Ali Pasha, and promising to outfit four hundred ships at her own expanse. However, Suleiman and his son Selim prevented the campaign from going forward so that the admiral, Piyale Pasha, might remain in Istanbul with his new wife, Gevherhan Sultan.

The two together had two sons, Sultanzade Mustafa Bey, who died in 1593, and Sultanzade Mehmed Bey, and three daughters, Ayşe Atike Hanımsultan, Fatma Hanımsultan, and Hatice Hanımsultan. One of them married Sinanpaşaoğlu Mehmed Pasha in November 1598

In 1575, just after her brother Sultan Murad ascended to the throne her daily stipend consisted of 250 aspers. Gevherhan was widowed at Piyale Pasha's death in 1578.

Second marriage
In 1579, Gevherhan Sultan married Cerrah Mehmed Pasha. When he was promoted from the generalship of the janissaries to the governorship of Rumelia in March 1580, people opined that it was due to the political power of Gevherhan Sultan. In 1583, he presented Handan to then Prince Mehmed (later Mehmed III) on his departure for Manisa. In 1598, when her husband was appointed the grand vizier during Mehmed III's reign, Gevherhan became an influential political figure in court circles. This position seems to have enabled her to keep in touch with Mehmed III's sons and their mothers as well. Gevherhan was known to be extremely jealous of this husband. On one occasion, she was reported to have stabbed one of her Kalfa because she believed she was provoking her husband.

Gevherhan wrote many letters to her youngest son, sancakbeyi of Klis Salih Bey in Dalmatia, which were considered so important from a political point of view that their translations were sent in Venice by the baylo. She also protected her daughter's husband Sinanpaşaoğlu Mehmed Pasha. She was on friendly terms with Süleyman Agha, the mute of Safiye Sultan.

Soon after his succession, Mehmed's son by Handan Sultan, Ahmed I wanted to express his gratitude to Mehmed Pasha and Gevherhan Sultan for the role they had played in bringing his parents together. By then, however, Cerrah Mehmed Pasha was old and ailing, and died on 9 January 1604. Ahmed, therefore, honored the late pasha's wife. Venetian bailo Contarini records that "having remembered this [i.e., his mother’s background], he sent the sultana [Gevherhan] a thousand gold coins and a sable robe with many other gifts as a sign of welcome, since she had been the origin of his good fortune and of the greatness in which at present he found himself."

Ahmed also named One of his daughter Gevherhan to further mark his great-aunt's role in his life. Her daily stipend consisted of 350 aspers.

Charities
From her properties she constituted a religious and charitable foundation with whose revenues built and maintained a high theological college in the İstanbul neighbourhood of Cağaloğlu.

Death
When she died, she was buried in the mausoleum of her father Sultan Selim II's, next to Hagia Sophia Mosque.

Issue
Gevherhan had two sons and three daughters by her first marriage:
Sultanzade Mehmed Bey: firstly governor of Peloponnese, until his uncle Murad III, at the request of his mother, appointed him to the position of governor of Herzegovina. He died in 1593.
Sultanzade Mustafa Bey. He probraly died in infancy.
Ayşe Atike Hanımsultan: born in 1563. She was married to Doğancıbaşı Kerim Ağa. Atike died in 1614, shortly before the birth of Ahmed I's daughter Atike Sultan, who was named in honor of her.
Fatma Hanımsultan: married to some Ibrahim Bey. 
Hatice Hanımsultan: sometimes considered as a daughter of Cerrah Mehmed Pasha. She married Sinanpasazade Mehmed Pasha in November 1598, until Ahmed I executed him in 1605. It is not known if she remarried. Her palace (known as Piyale Pasha Palace) was left to Ismihan Kaya Sultan after her death.
Gevherhan had a son by her second marriage:
Sultanzade Salih Bey. Governor of Klis.

References

Sources
 
 
 

1544 births
16th-century Ottoman princesses
17th-century Ottoman princesses
Year of death unknown